Al Haymah Ad Dakhiliyah District is a district of the Sana'a Governorate, Yemen. , the district had a population of 83,234 inhabitants.

References

Districts of Sanaa Governorate
Al Haymah Ad Dakhiliyah District